Offroad Thunder is an offroad racing arcade game released in 1999. It forms part of Midway's "Thunder" series of racing games, which also includes Hydro Thunder, 4 Wheel Thunder, and Arctic Thunder and is itself an evolution of Off Road Challenge.

Offroad Thunder was included in Midway Arcade Treasures 3 for Xbox, PlayStation 2 and GameCube.

Gameplay
 Demolition - Running into other cars without getting caught. If so, the game will be over.
 Rally - Racing and catching canisters of nitros (Blue - +3, Red - +5). Players will be required to get first place to earn a free race as a reward. 
 Snag The Flag - Players must win the game with the flag. When an opponent overtakes the player, the player loses the flag to the opponent. There are 4 opponents in this mode.

External links 

1999 video games
Arcade video games
GameCube games
Midway video games
PlayStation 2 games
Racing video games
Thunder (video game series)
Video games developed in the United States
Video games scored by Aubrey Hodges
Xbox games